Sir Riggs Falkiner, 1st Baronet (c. 1712 – 24 April 1797) was an Irish baronet and politician.

He was the oldest son of Caleb Falkiner, a merchant of Cork city, and his wife Ruth Riggs, daughter of Edward Riggs of Riggsdale. He was a cousin of the politician Daniel Falkiner., and on his mother's side of the writer Anna, Lady Miller,  née Riggs. He sat in the Irish House of Commons for Clonakilty from 1768 to 1776 and subsequently for Castlemartyr to 1783. On 24 August 1778, he was created a baronet, of Anne Mount, in the County of Cork.

On 5 January 1737, Falkiner married firstly Mary Barker. She died in 1762, and Falkiner married secondly Anne Maturin, daughter of Reverend Gabriel James Maturin, in October 1764. He had four daughters and three sons by his first wife,  and one daughter Sarah Anne by his second wife. Falkiner died in 1797 and was succeeded in the baronetcy by his only surviving son Samuel. His daughter Elizabeth married Attiwell Wood, a prominent local  barrister  who, no doubt through a family arrangement, represented the same two constituencies as his father-in-law between 1769 and 1783. His youngest daughter, Sarah Anne, in 1784 married William Mullins, 2nd Baron Ventry, but died in 1788, leaving two daughters.

References

1720s births
1797 deaths
Baronets in the Baronetage of Ireland
Irish MPs 1769–1776
Irish MPs 1776–1783
Members of the Parliament of Ireland (pre-1801) for County Cork constituencies